Derochie is a surname. Notable people with the surname include:

Angela Derochie (born 1973), Canadian competitive figure skater
Darren Derochie (born 1966), Canadian cross-country skier
Joseph Derochie (born 1939), Canadian sprint canoer